The 6×45mm is a rimless, bottlenecked cartridge based on the .223 Remington or 5.56 NATO cartridge necked up to .243 (6mm). The cartridge is also known as the 6mm-223 Remington or 6mm/223.

History
Soon after the release of the .223 Remington as a commercial cartridge, shooters began experimenting with the cartridge in an attempt to improve its performance. Several of these experimenters necked up the .223 Remington to 6mm as the  caliber bullets provided better external ballistic performance over  caliber bullets. While several variations existed between early versions of these cartridges, the 6×45mm as we know it today became the standard version of the cartridge which is simply a necked up version of the .223 Remington without any further modifications or improvements made to it.

General Information
The cartridge's inherent accuracy was a carry over from the .222 Remington which already had a loyal following in benchrest shooting fraternity. Benchrest shooters soon took notice of the cartridge and began building custom rifles chambered for the cartridge. However, its use in competitive shooting waned with the arrival of the 6mm BR and 6mm PPC cartridges on the benchrest shooting scene.

The cartridge is extremely efficient with its small powder charge. This translates to excellent barrel life. The cartridge has very low recoil and muzzle blast which make it a pleasant cartridge to shoot.

Since the cartridge was never commercially adopted by an ammunition manufacturer, it has remained a wildcat cartridge since its inception. However, making cases from existing .223 Remington brass is as simple as running the case through a 6×45mm die. The availability of .223 cases, the ease of forming, and the light powder charge make for a very affordable shooting cartridge.

Performance
The advantage of the 6×45 mm over the .223 Remington is that it is capable of being loaded with heavier bullets with better ballistic coefficient ratings than its parent cartridge, the .223 Remington. This results in less susceptibility to wind drift and better energy retention characteristics.

Cartridge Specifications
The 6×45 mm is a wildcat cartridge and has not been standardized by any agency nor has it been offered a proprietary cartridge by any ammunition manufacturer. Some specialty rifle makers such as those that sell varmint rifles offer rifles chambered in this cartridge. Specifications for the cartridge are derived from the necked up parent cartridge without further improvement.

For this reason overall length of the cartridge may vary.

Hunting Applications
Many countries and many U.S. states require a minimum of .24 caliber (6.1 mm) for hunting certain game species, such as deer. In such countries and states the 6×45mm would be legal for hunting as long as no further requirement regarding power, energy, or case length is stipulated. However, it should be considered a marginal cartridge for these game species at best.

The cartridge gained a following in South Africa where it was used to hunt small antelope and gazelle species such as duiker, impala, klipspringer, springbok and the Thompson's gazelles. In North America it is capable of taking small predator species such as bobcats, coyotes and foxes. In many European countries, it can be used for small goat and deer species such as the roe deer and chamois where legally permitted. For example in the Netherlands, rifle calibers in 6mm are allowed for roe deer if they retain a kinetic energy of at least 980 Joule at 100 meters.(Dutch)

An improved version of the cartridge called the 6 mm TCU was developed for metallic silhouette shooting. While the cartridges are quite similar they are not interchangeable.

Firearms
The AR-15/M16 can easily be converted to the 6×45mm with a simple barrel swap with few or no further modifications to the rifle. This is also true for rifles such as Ruger's Mini-14 and most bolt-action rifles chambered for the .223 Remington cartridge. The 6×45mm cartridge provides better down range performance than the .223 Remington or the 5.56 NATO cartridges.  The cartridge is currently offered by Les Baer in an AR rifle.  The cartridge had been offered by Cooper Arms, Kimber and a few other rifle manufacturers in their rifles as a regular factory chambering for a period of time.

However, the cartridge's breakthrough was in the area of handgun hunting where it became very popular. The bolt-action Remington XP-100 pistol and the break-action Thompson/Center Contender handgun were chambered for the cartridge. It provided a flat-shooting cartridge capable of taking small deer and small game species.

In February 2010, Black Hills Ammunition began selling 6×45mm ammunition.  They use standard .243 bullets weighing 85 and 100 gr.  Sporting Products LLC also began to distribute AR-15 uppers and complete rifles chambered for the 6×45mm.

Shultz & Larsen of Denmark offer the "Legacy" model. A light weight (2,65 kg / 5lbs 13,5oz), miniature action, barrel swap rifle system. Calibers offered are .222 Rem (1/10" twist), .223 Rem (1/8" and 1/10" twist), 6x45 (1/8" twist) and .300 Whisper (1/7,5" twist). standard barrels are 510 mm / 20" long.

See also
 6 mm caliber
 6×45mm SAW
 List of rifle cartridges
 Wildcat cartridge

References

Pistol and rifle cartridges
Wildcat cartridges